Dysschema fanatica is a moth of the family Erebidae. It was described by Paul Dognin in 1919. It is found in Colombia.

References

Dysschema
Moths described in 1919